Hemaris is a genus of sphinx moths in the subfamily Macroglossinae, which is native to the Holarctic. Their main host plants are herbs and shrubs of the teasel and honeysuckle families. Moths in genus Hemaris are known collectively as clearwing moths or hummingbird moths in the US and Canada and bee hawk-moths in Britain. The related Old World hummingbird hawk-moths, genus Macroglossum, are similar in appearance and habits. Both genera have tails that are provided with an expansile truncated tuft of hairs, but only Hemaris has the disc of the wings transparent, as these scales are dropped soon after eclosion.

Description
The eggs are small, spherical, and pale glossy green in color. Host plants include shrub and vining honeysuckles and teasels.

The larvae are small, cylindrical, and covered in granules that often have small bristles. Most larvae are green, brown, and gray, but there are many color forms. All have a distinctive pale dorsolateral longitudinal stripe from head to horn.

The pupa is enclosed in a loosely spun cocoon, and is glossy in most species. There is a prominent tubercle or hook alongside each eye. The cremaster of the chrysalis is large and flattened.

The imagoes, or adults, are small, diurnal moths that resemble bumblebees in shape. They are often mistaken for hummingbirds. The forewings are fully scaled, but in some species patches of scales are lost during the first flight, leaving a glassy hyaline area on each wing. The antennae are strongly clubbed in both sexes and each has a small, recurved hook at the end. The abdomen ends in a large fan of setae.

The genitalia of the male are asymmetrical; the uncus is divided into two subequal lobes and is sclerotized. The ostium bursae, or genital opening, of the female is angled to the left.

Species
There are 23 accepted species. Four species are native to North and South America, and three to Europe.
 Hemaris aethra (Strecker, 1875) – Diervilla clearwing
 Hemaris affinis Bremer, 1861 – honeysuckle bee hawkmoth
 Hemaris aksana (Le Cerf, 1923) – Atlas bee hawkmoth
 Hemaris alaiana (Rothschild & Jordan, 1903) – Alai bee hawkmoth
 Hemaris beresowskii Alpheraky, 1897
 Hemaris croatica (Esper, 1800) – olive bee hawkmoth
 Hemaris dentata (Staudinger, 1887) – Anatolian bee hawkmoth
 Hemaris diffinis (Boisduval, 1836) – snowberry clearwing
 Hemaris ducalis (Staudinger, 1887) – Pamir bee hawkmoth
 Hemaris fuciformis (Linnaeus, 1758) – broad-bordered bee hawk-moth
 Hemaris galunae Eitschberger, Müller & Kravchenko, 2005 – Levant bee hawkmoth
 Hemaris gracilis (Grote & Robinson, 1865) – slender clearwing or graceful clearwing
 Hemaris molli Eitschberger, Müller & Kravchenko, 2005
 Hemaris ottonis (Rothschild & Jordan, 1903)
 Hemaris radians (Walker, 1856)
 Hemaris rubra Hampson, [1893] – Kashmir bee hawkmoth
 Hemaris saldaitisi Eitschberger, Danner & Surholt, 1998
 Hemaris saundersii (Walker, 1856) – Saunders' bee hawkmoth
 Hemaris staudingeri Leech, 1890
 Hemaris syra (Daniel, 1939) – Syrian bee hawkmoth
 Hemaris thetis Boisduval, 1855 – Rocky Mountain clearwing or California clearwing
 Hemaris thysbe (Fabricius, 1775) – hummingbird clearwing
 Hemaris tityus (Linnaeus, 1758) – narrow-bordered bee hawk-moth
 Hemaris venata (Felder, 1861)

Gallery

References

 
Taxa named by Johan Wilhelm Dalman
Moth genera